The men's 400 metre freestyle S12 event at the 2012 Paralympic Games took place on 30 August, at the London Aquatics Centre.

Two heats were held, one with five swimmers and the other with six. The swimmers with the eight fastest times advanced to the final.

Sergey Punko won the gold medal in a time of 04:10.26. It was Russia's first gold of the London 2012 Paralympics.

Heats

Heat 1

Heat 2

Final

References
Official London 2012 Paralympics Results  
Final Result

Swimming at the 2012 Summer Paralympics